Clementina is a municipality in the state of São Paulo in Brazil. The population is 8,757 (2020 est.) in an area of 169 km2. The elevation is 465 m.

References

Municipalities in São Paulo (state)